The Gibraltar College is a school in the British Overseas Territory of Gibraltar, providing  programmes at academic, vocational and professional levels. It focuses on the post-16 age group, promoting a culture of lifelong learning.

Located on South Bastion, the college has been run by the Government of Gibraltar since 1985.

The college's began when it was joined with the Dockyard Technical School established in 1948, and the Queensway site opened in 1949. It was converted into the Technical College during the 1960s.

Notable staff
 Clive Beltran - Principal (2002-2003), went on to become Government Minister for Education and Training and as well as Mayor of Gibraltar.

See also
Bayside Comprehensive School
Westside School (Gibraltar)

References

Schools in Gibraltar